Zione  (also Romanized as Zīvān) is a village in , Fashapuyeh District, Ray County, Tehran Province, Iran. At the 2006 census, its population was 693, in 171 families.

References 

Populated places in Ray County, Iran